Irene Gibbons can refer to:

 Irene Lenz (1900-62), American costume designer usually called Irene
 Eva Taylor (1895-1977), American singer (birth name)